Selaginella denticulata, or Mediterranean clubmoss, is a non-flowering plant of the spikemoss genus Selaginella with a wide distribution around the Northern Hemisphere.

Description
It is in the genus Selaginella and this creeper is characterized by having flattened stems, bearing four rows of ovate leaves which vary in size according to their position. Its specific epithet, "denticulata" comes from the Latin "dens" which means tooth, and alludes to the denticles that appear on the leaves. It was identified by the nineteenth century botanist Antoine Frédéric Spring.

It is distributed throughout the Mediterranean region except for the Cape Verde islands. It is not under threat although it is less common in the Eastern Mediterranean. It prefers dark cave environments and it is found on Gibraltar, throughout the Mediterranean region and in Portugal. In the spring it is green but as it dries out the plant is red.

References

denticulata
Flora of Asia
Flora of Europe
Flora of North America